The Alfred C. and Nettie Ruby House is a historic residence in Portland, Oregon, United States. Built in 1926–1927, it is an exceptional example of the Tudor Revival style as interpreted by architect Walter E. Kelly. It exhibits classic Tudor hallmarks, such as decorative half-timbering, as well as features less commonly associated with the style, such as rolled eaves to simulate a thatched roof.

The house was entered on the National Register of Historic Places in 2006.

See also
National Register of Historic Places listings in Northeast Portland, Oregon

References

External links

Oregon Historic Sites Database entry

Tudor Revival architecture in Oregon
Houses completed in 1927
1927 establishments in Oregon
Houses on the National Register of Historic Places in Portland, Oregon
Laurelhurst, Portland, Oregon
Portland Historic Landmarks